Umashaul (Umaşavul) is a rural locality (a selo) in Batayurtovsky Selsoviet, Khasavyurtovsky District, Republic of Dagestan, Russia. The population was 1,453 as of 2010. There are 12 streets.

Geography 
Umashaul is located 16 km northeast of Khasavyurt (the district's administrative centre) by road. Batayurt is the nearest rural locality.

References 

Rural localities in Khasavyurtovsky District